Erastus Cole Knight (March 1, 1857 in Buffalo, Erie County, New York – September 3, 1923 in New York City) was an American businessman and politician.

Life
He attended Public School 16 and 14, and graduated from Bryant & Stratton College in Buffalo. Afterwards, he worked for the Bell Brothers wholesale produce house, and went on the road as a salesman for them. The produce business interested Knight and he founded Knight, Lennox & Co. with William C. Lennox in 1880. On May 14, 1881, he married Mary Elizabeth Cowles, and their daughter was Gertrude Knight who married Assemblyman Herbert B. Shonk (1881–1930).

After dissolving the partnership with Lennox in 1887, Knight established a real estate and insurance business. In 1892 he formed with Oliver A. Jenkins the construction company of Jenkins & Knight. Knight was also a partner in the firm Sloan, Cowles & Co., proprietors of excursion steamers and summer resorts.

He entered politics as a Republican and was a supervisor of Buffalo from 1889 to 1894, and was Chairman of the Board of Supervisors in the latter year. He was Buffalo City Comptroller from 1895 to 1900, re-elected in 1898 on the Democratic ticket.

He was New York State Comptroller in 1901, elected after the incumbent William J. Morgan, who had been re-nominated at the Republican state convention, died unexpectedly and Knight was substituted on the ticket. As sitting State Comptroller he ran for Mayor of Buffalo in November 1900, and was elected, serving from 1902 to 1905. He was an alternate delegate to the 1904 Republican National Convention. He did not seek re-election and returned to his private business.

In 1903 he had opened a coal company with his brother George, the E. C. & G. L. Knight Company. In 1905, he organized the Isle of Pines Company, a fruit exporting business, and became its president.

In 1920 he moved to New York City. In August 1923 he fell and broke his hip. He never fully recovered from it, and although surgery was tried, it was unsuccessful. On September 3, 1923, Knight died at his home in the Hotel Pennsylvania, and was buried in Forest Lawn Cemetery, Buffalo.

Sources
The Political Graveyard: Index to Politicians: Knight at politicalgraveyard.com Political Graveyard
 Buffalo election, in NYT on November 6, 1901
 His resignation as Comptroller, in NYT on December 29, 1901
The Mayor's of Buffalo, New York -Erastus C. Knight at www.buffalonian.com Mayors of Buffalo, at The Buffalonian

1857 births
1923 deaths
New York State Comptrollers
Mayors of Buffalo, New York
Burials at Forest Lawn Cemetery (Buffalo)
New York (state) Republicans
Bryant and Stratton College alumni